Phakin Khamwilaisak (born August 29, 1986), nicknamed Tono,  is a Thai singer, actor and footballer from Khon Kaen, Thailand. He became known in 2010 from participating in the sixth season of the singing competition The Star.

In 2021, he started to play as a midfielder for Thai League 1 club Ratchaburi Mitr Phol after given a short term 6 month contract.

Early life and education
Phakin is the eldest son and he has a younger sister. His nickname Tono is based on an alias his father used as a boxer. He graduated from Suan Dusit Rajabhat University (since 2015 changed to Suan Dusit University).

Career
Phakin is best known as Tono the star 6. He is so-called because he was among the eight finalists that competed in The Star, season 6, a singing contest that is broadcast live on Thai television. Phakin did not win the Star 6 but he was the second runner up with Rueangrit Siriphanit (Ritz the Star 6) as the first runner up and Napat Injaiuea (Gun the Star 6) as the winner.

In 2021, he joined Ratchaburi Mitr Phol FC as a footballer.

Personal life
He used to be in a relationship with actress Pataratida Patcharawirapong from 2013 to 2015.
The two separated in 2015. Tono has been linked to channel 3 actress Nuttanicha Dungwattanawanich since 2016 after they starred in The Cupids Series: Kammathep Sorn Kol. The two often go travel and do merits together with their families. Both deny the title of "boyfriend and girlfriend" but have been exclusive since 2017.

This activity can receive donations up to 60 million baht.

Filmography

Film

Dramas

TV sitcoms

Musicals

Discography

Soundtracks

Awards and recognition 
 2019 Phakin was the first Asian to be nominated as an ambassador by the United Nations Ocean Conference

Club

References

External links 
 
 

Phakin Khamwilaisak
Living people
Phakin Khamwilaisak
Phakin Khamwilaisak
1986 births
Phakin Khamwilaisak
Phakin Khamwilaisak
Phakin Khamwilaisak
Phakin Khamwilaisak
Phakin Khamwilaisak
Phakin Khamwilaisak
Association football midfielders